The canton of Mauriac is an administrative division of the Cantal department, southern France. Its borders were modified at the French canton reorganisation which came into effect in March 2015. Its seat is in Mauriac.

It consists of the following communes:
 
Ally
Anglards-de-Salers
Barriac-les-Bosquets
Brageac
Chalvignac
Chaussenac
Drugeac
Escorailles
Le Fau
Fontanges
Mauriac
Pleaux
Saint-Bonnet-de-Salers
Sainte-Eulalie
Saint-Martin-Cantalès
Saint-Martin-Valmeroux
Saint-Paul-de-Salers
Salers
Salins
Le Vigean

References

Cantons of Cantal